Irma Aguirre Martínez (born 21 December 1933), commonly known as Irma Dorantes, is a Mexican actress, singer, and equestrian. One of the last surviving stars from the Golden Age of Mexican cinema.

Career
Her first film, Los tres huastecos, was released in 1948. Dorantes participated in many Mexican films of the 1950s and 1960s. In 1963, she was nominated for a Silver Goddess Award for Best Supporting Actress for her performance in Sol en llamas (1962). Aside from acting, she is also a successful singer, obtaining gold and platinum records for her versions of the songs "Cuando no sé de ti", "Pequeña", "Ansiedad", "Recuerdos de Ipacarai", and "La Flor de la Canela". She was also known for her equestrian shows. In 1964, Dorantes and her horses Gatillo de Oro and Justiciero headed a touring company at the Million Dollar Theater in Los Angeles, California. Later in her career, she played supporting roles in telenovelas such as Cuando me enamoro (2010).

Personal life
She was married to actor Pedro Infante until his death in 1957. They had one child, actress and singer Irma Infante.

Selected filmography

 Los tres huastecos (1948)
 The Woman of the Port (1949)
 También de dolor se canta (1950)
 Over the Waves (1950)
 Women Without Tomorrow (1951)
 Now I Am Rich (1952)
 Pablo and Carolina (1957)
 Juan Polainas (1960)
 El revólver sangriento (1964)
 Las delicias del poder (1999)
 La hija de Moctezuma (2014)

References

External links

 

1934 births
Living people
20th-century Mexican actresses
Mexican film actresses
Mexican television actresses
Mexican telenovela actresses
Mexican women singers
Ranchera singers
Bolero singers
Musart Records artists
Mexican female equestrians
Actresses from Yucatán (state)
Singers from Yucatán (state)
People from Mérida, Yucatán